Disney Television Studios is the television studio arm of the Disney Entertainment division of The Walt Disney Company established on May 15, 2019 to succeed Walt Disney Television following Disney's acquisition of 21st Century Fox.

The division oversees Disney's television studio assets including ABC Signature, 20th Television, 20th Television Animation, FX Productions and the newly-formed Walt Disney Television Alternative unit.

Assets

Current 
 20th Television
 Regency Television International (50%)
 20th Television Animation
 ABC Signature
 FXP
 Walt Disney Television Alternative

Former 
 The original 20th Television — merged into Disney–ABC Domestic Television
 ABC Signature Studios (2013–2020) — merged with ABC Studios to form ABC Signature
 ABC Studios (2007–2020) — originally Touchstone Television (first incarnation) (1985–2007), merged with ABC Signature Studios to form ABC Signature
 Touchstone Television (2014–2020) (second incarnation) — originally Fox Television Studios (1997–2014), Fox 21 (2004–2014) and Fox 21 Television Studios (2014–2020), folded into 20th Television

Filmography

Television programs

References

Disney Television Studios
2019 establishments in California
American companies established in 2019
Disney Media Networks
Mass media companies established in 2019
American Broadcasting Company
Companies based in Burbank, California